Eliyantha Lindsay White (1971 – 22 September 2021) was a Sri Lankan shaman who used traditional herbs. He treated several world leaders and many cricket players.

Despite claiming to have developed a cure for COVID-19, White died of the virus on 22 September 2021, at a private hospital in Colombo.

Early life
Eliyantha White is of British heritage. He appears to have grown up in the town of Kalubowila, Sri Lanka and began his treatments at the age of 12 by treating someone who was suffering from an incurable cancer. He claimed to be able to materialise medicine through spirits of Rishis, which he then used to cure people. He studied traditional medicine in both Sri Lanka and India.

Rise to fame

White initially started treating people at Eeyamporuwa Temple in Madiwela. From here, his popularity rose to a point where he was apparently hounded in the streets and was treating over a thousand patients a day. He was always committed to treating people free of charge.

In March 2010, Eliyantha invited David Beckham to Sri Lanka for treatment of an injury. He claimed to be able to put Beckham back on the field in three days. It is unclear whether Beckham took up this offer.

Controversies
Some of White's treatments have been the subject of intense controversy.

In May 2011, Upul Tharanga, a Sri Lankan cricketer failed a dope test conducted by ICC and it was rumoured that Tharanga had been treated by White and the medication given by White contained the banned substance, due to which Tharanga failed the dope test. However, Tharanga has not officially confirmed that he was treated by White. But Sri Lankan sports minister confirmed that White treated Tharanga. However Tharanga had been treated by other doctors as well.

On 15 July 2011, the International Cricket Council's Independent Anti-Doping Tribunal decision in the case of Tharanga discussed in some detail the question whether Eliyantha White's medicine may have contained banned substances.

Despite claims that Eliyantha was also the Sri Lankan president's personal physician, this fact was sometimes disputed.

Political status
In April 2012, during an adjournment debate in Parliament on legal recognition to alternative systems of treatment, members were unanimous in complimenting the physician’s performance. Several opposition parliamentarians praised White for his abilities and requested more security for him.  
MP A. H. M. Azwer tabled in the House letters of appreciation from many persons including Minister Lakshman Seneviratne and Bandula Gunawardena, Lal Wickrematunge, national cricketers Kumar Sangakkara and Tilakaratne Dilshan.

Public figures treated by White
Himeth Thewmika
Harsha de Silva
Bipasha Basu
 Salman Khan
 Sachin Tendulkar
 Ashish Nehra
 Ian Chappell
 Lasith Malinga
 Lakshman Senewiratne
 Bandula Gunawardena
 Kiribathgoda Gnananada Thero
 Lasantha Wickrematunge
 Parents of Mellony Wijesinghe - Sri Lankan netball player who played in the position of goal shooter in international netball tournaments claim.

Lal Wickrematunge
 'Bothale Gamini', the elephant
 Latha Walpola, singer

Although some public figures seem to have had well publicised success with Eliyantha White's treatments, it is unclear whether regular patients enjoy the same. It is said that he has successfully treated thousands of people in the past at Eeyamporuwa temple at Madiwela.

References

1973 births
2021 deaths
Sri Lankan Ayurvedic practitioners
Faith healers
People from Colombo
Deaths from the COVID-19 pandemic in Sri Lanka
Sri Lankan people of English descent